Urangatha Ninaivugal is a 1983 Indian Tamil-language film directed by R.Bhaskaran. The film stars Sivakumar, Menaka, Radhika and Rajeev.

Plot

Cast 
Sivakumar
Menaka
Radhika
Rajeev
Sathyaraj

Soundtrack 
Soundtrack was composed by Ilaiyaraaja. The song "Narumana Malargalin" is set in Vagadheeswari raga.

References

External links 
 

1983 films
Films scored by Ilaiyaraaja
1980s Tamil-language films